The Japan campaign was a series of battles and engagements in and around the Japanese home islands, between Allied forces and the forces of Imperial Japan during the last stages of the Pacific campaign of World War II. The Japan campaign lasted from around June 1944 to August 1945.

Air war
Periodic air raids on Japan were the first attacks undertaken by Allied forces. In late 1944, these raids were followed by a major strategic bombing of cities, factories, and other war infrastructure throughout Japan, most notably:
 Operation Meetinghouse raid on Tokyo (9-10 March 1945): 100,000 Japanese were killed, mostly civilians, including in the conflagration that followed the firebombing.
 Bombing of Kure (24-28 July 1945): Most of the surviving large Japanese warships were lost, leaving the Nagato as the only remaining capital ship in Japan's inventory.
 Atomic bombing of Hiroshima (6 August 1945): Of approximately 90,000–140,000 deaths, 20,000 were Japanese combatants and 20,000 were Korean slave laborers.
 Atomic bombing of Nagasaki (9 August 1945): Of approximately 39,000–80,000 deaths, 27,778 were Japanese munitions workers, 2,000 were Korean slave laborers, and 150 were Japanese combatants.

The air raids resulted in heavy damage to Japanese infrastructure and the deaths of 241,000–900,000 Japanese citizens (mostly civilians), as well as the loss thousands of aircraft and flak guns. The Allies, in turn, only lost a few hundred aircraft (mostly bombers) to Japanese anti-air defenses and fighters.

Land and sea battles
In early 1945, there were two major island battles:
 The Battle of Iwo Jima (16 February to 26 March): Of approximately 21,000 Japanese defenders, only 216 survived.
 The Battle of Okinawa (1 April to 21 June): Of approximately 100,000 Japanese defenders, only 24,455 survived.

There were also two naval battles:
 Operation Ten-Go (7 April): Most of the Japanese vessels committed were lost.
 The Battle of Tokyo Bay (22 and 23 July 1945): Most of the Japanese vessels committed were heavily damaged or lost.

Allied warships also bombarded several Japanese cities during July and August 1945.

The battles of Iwo Jima and Okinawa foretold what was to be expected when the Japanese Home Islands were attacked. Iwo Jima and Okinawa were lost only after extremely fierce resistance was overcome. In both cases, the Japanese refused to surrender and there were few survivors. While Japanese losses were extremely high, Allied forces paid dearly to take both islands.

Naval operations included a suicidal Japanese counteroffensive on 7 April 1945 (Operation Ten-Go), to relieve Okinawa and an Allied campaign to place air and submarine-delivered mines in Japanese shipping lanes. This was illustrated by the naval surface interdiction of Tokyo Bay in July 1945.

In late 1945, the Soviet Union launched a series of successful invasions of northern Japanese territories, in preparation for the possible invasion of Hokkaido:
 Invasion of South Sakhalin (11—25 August)
 Maoka Landing (19—22 August)
 Invasion of the Kuril Islands (18 August to 1 September)
 Battle of Shumshu (18—23 August)

The end

World War II ended with the surrender of Japan after the atomic bombings of Hiroshima and Nagasaki. Before those two attacks, Japan was unwilling to surrender. The firebombing of Japanese cities resulted in 350,000 civilian deaths but did not move the government towards surrender. The Japanese government was clearly prepared to fight an Allied invasion of the home islands as fiercely as they had defended Iwo Jima and fought on the Japanese home island of Okinawa.

The Japan campaign was intended to provide staging areas and preparation for a possible Allied invasion of Japan and to support Allied air and naval campaigns against the Japanese mainland. Japan still had a homeland army of about two million soldiers and sufficient resources to cripple an Allied invasion. Consequently, had that invasion been necessary, it most likely would have resulted in a much higher death toll for both sides.

See also
 Surrender of Japan
 Japanese Instrument of Surrender
 Japanese war crimes
 Occupation of Japan
 United States strategic bombing of Japan
 Soviet invasion of Manchuria — Launched by the Soviet Union after the first atomic bombing.
 Victory over Japan Day

References

Sources

External links
 

Pacific theatre of World War II
1944 in Japan
1945 in Japan
 
United States Marine Corps in World War II
Campaigns of World War II
Campaigns, operations and battles of World War II involving the United Kingdom